Alfred Merlin (13 March 1876, in Orléans – 16 March 1965, in Neuilly-sur-Seine) was a 20th-century French historian, archaeologist, pioneer and founder of underwater archaeology, a numismatist and epigrapher.

Biography 
After his studies at the École Normale Supérieure, he obtained the agrégation in history and geography in 1900 then left to the École française de Rome (1901–1903). He then held the position of director of the Antiquities Service in Tunisia between 1906 and 1920, where he was one of the pioneers of the exploration of the archaeological site of Dougga, between 1901 and 1902.

In 1907 he was alerted by Greek sponge fishermen cruising between Sousse and Sfax on the existence of a cluster of columns mixed with debris of all kinds lying forty meters deep. Merlin then enlisted local maritime authorities and financial support to launch the first campaign of underwater archaeological excavation on the Mahdia shipwreck. He thus brought to the surface some Athenian art objects dating back to the first century B.C., including the famous Hermes bronze Dionysus, signed by the sculptor Boethus. Campaigns on the wreck by Merlon followed each other until 1913.

He then became curator and chief curator of Greek and Roman antiquities at the Louvre Museum from 1921 to 1946. In 1928 he was elected a member of the Académie des Inscriptions et Belles-Lettres, of which he was permanent secretary until 1964.

Alfred Merlin was the son in law of historian René Cagnat; his wife Renée died 2 March 1965 aged 89.

Publications 
The vast majority of works by Alfred Merlin consists of communications made to the Comité des travaux historiques et scientifiques :
 L'Aventin dans l'Antiquité, BEFR, fasc. 97, 1906 ;
 L'Année épigraphique (director).

Reference

Sources and bibliography 
 Pierre Boyancé, "Nécrologie : Alfred Merlin (1876-1965)", Mélanges d'archéologie et d'histoire, vol. 77, N° 77-2, 1965, (p. 641–642) (read online)
 Georges Tessier, "Notice sur la vie et les travaux de M. Alfred Merlin, Secrétaire perpétuel honoraire de l'Académie", CRAI, vol. 109, N° 2, 1965, (p. 482–494) (read online)

External links 
 Der Unterwasser-Pionier
 Biographie d'Alfred Merlin on Comité des travaux historiques et scientifiques

20th-century French historians
French archaeologists
French numismatists
French epigraphers
People associated with the Louvre
Members of the Académie des Inscriptions et Belles-Lettres
École Normale Supérieure alumni
Collège Stanislas de Paris alumni
1876 births
People from Orléans
1965 deaths